Archery at the 1980 Summer Olympics was held at the archery field, located at the Krylatskoye Olympic Sports Centre (Krylatskoye district, Moscow). The archery schedule began on 30 July and ended on 2 August. Points were in a format called the double FITA round, which included 288 arrows shot over four days at four different distances: 70 meters, 60 meters, 50 meters, 30 meters for women; 90 meters, 70 meters, 50 meters, 30 meters for men.

Medal summary

Events

Medal table

Participating nations

See also
 Archery at the 1979 Pan American Games

References

 
1980
1980 Summer Olympics events
Olympics